Allegories of the Five Senses is a series of early-17th-century paintings by the Spanish artist Jusepe de Ribera. One of the series (Hearing) has been lost and is known only through copies.

According to the art historian Giulio Mancini, a contemporary of the artist, their commissioner was Spanish but they were probably produced during Ribera's stay in Rome. Alfonso Pérez Sánchez dates their production to between 1611 and 1615.

References

Bibliography

External links
Sight, Franz Mayer Museum.

1610s paintings
Paintings by Jusepe de Ribera
17th-century allegorical paintings
Allegorical paintings by Spanish artists